Betty Go-Belmonte station is an elevated Manila Light Rail Transit (LRT) station situated on Line 2. The station during its inception was formerly called as Boston station but was renamed into the current name due to the minor realignment of some stations (the other being V. Mapa) that has caused the change of proximity to the Betty Go-Belmonte Street. The station is located in New Manila in Quezon City and is named after Betty Go-Belmonte, the late wife of House Speaker Feliciano Belmonte Jr. and the founder of The Philippine Star.

The station is the seventh station for trains headed to both Antipolo and Recto stations.

Nearby landmarks

The station is located near Cubao Cathedral, Holy Buddhist Temple, Religious of the Virgin Mary Motherhouse, and Kalayaan College.

Transportation links
There are tricycles, jeepneys, taxis, and buses are available outside the station.

References

See also
Manila Light Rail Transit System Line 2

Manila Light Rail Transit System stations
Railway stations opened in 2004
Buildings and structures in Quezon City